Oras Tynkkynen (Topi Oras Kalevi Tynkkynen, born 1977) was a Member of the Parliament of Finland, representing the Green League. Tynkkynen was the chair of the Green parliamentary group. He served as Prime Minister Matti Vanhanen's Advisor on Climate Policy. Also Tynkkynen is a Member of the City Council of Tampere and an environmental activist. He has also held positions in numerous other organisations, such as Friends of the Earth Finland. Oras Tynkkynen became a member of Parliament in 2004 as a replacement when Satu Hassi left her seat upon her election to the European Parliament. He was directly elected to the Parliament in 2007.

Tynkkynen was born in Jyväskylä, Finland. He graduated from the Department of Journalism and Mass Communication at the University of Tampere. From the age of 14 he has been active in environmental and developmental organizations. He is a founding member of Friends of the Earth Finland and has been its vice president in 1996-1997 and in the spring of 2004. Tynkkynen has written articles in many newspapers and has been a reporter for YLE's radio news. His writings often concentrate on equity and the environment, especially climate change.

Tynkkynen is running for election to the European Parliament.

Personal life 

He was the first openly gay Member of the Parliament of Finland, but has since been joined by others, such as Jani Toivola and Silvia Modig. In his free time he enjoys sports, reading, electronic music and travel.

References

External links 
  Official website

1977 births
Living people
People from Jyväskylä
Green League politicians
Members of the Parliament of Finland (2003–07)
Members of the Parliament of Finland (2007–11)
Members of the Parliament of Finland (2011–15)
Gay politicians
Finnish LGBT politicians
Waldorf school alumni
University of Tampere alumni
LGBT legislators